North American Committee to Aid Spanish Democracy was an American organization established in 1936. It was an umbrella organization for ethnic groups and trade unions. The ethnic groups and trade unions donated money, medical necessities and food to Spain through the North American Committee to Aid Spanish Democracy. These donations were sent to Republicans during the Spanish Civil War.

North American Committee to Aid Spanish Democracy was identified as a Communist front linked to the Communist Party USA. Historian Peter N. Carroll describes this organization as a "Popular Front organization that attracted Communists and Christians alike."

References

Organizations established in 1936
Communist Party USA mass organizations
Organisations of the Spanish Civil War
Spain–United States relations